1992 Paralympics may refer to:
1992 Summer Paralympics
1992 Winter Paralympics